The Campaign of the Hills was the last campaign of the Paraguayan War, lasting from July 1869 to the end of the war on March 1, 1870. The Paraguayans were completely defeated by the Allies. Brazilian writer Alfredo d'Escragnolle Taunay, Viscount of Taunay took part in the campaign and later wrote about it. At least 5,000 Paraguayans were killed during this campaign.

Background
After the occupation of the Paraguayan capital, Asunción, by the allies, Marshal Luis Alves de Lima e Silva, Duke of Caxias considered the Paraguayan War to be ended with Allied victory. The marshal asked to be relieved of command on 12 Jan. 1869.  On 16 April 1869, Prince Gaston, Count of Eu took command of the Allied Army Headquarters in Luque, two days after his arrival in Asunción.

Since Paraguayan President López refused to surrender, the Allies installed a triumvirate.  Cirilo Antonio Rivarola, a political opponent of López, as temporary President in occupied Asunción, and decided to continue the war. López decided to resist the Allies in the mountainous region of Northeastern Paraguay.  López organized a force of 9,000 men and boys from his headquarters in Cerro León.

Battle of Piribebuy

The Allied attack on the town of Piribebuy, then serving as a temporary capital for the Paraguayan government, lasted 5 hours, ending with the capture of the town and destruction of its official records

Battle of Acosta Ñu

The last major battle, in which Bernardino Caballero (who later became President of Paraguay) fought a Brazilian-Argentine combined force of 20,000 under Emperor Pedro II's son-in-law Prince Gaston and future Brazilian president Manoel Deodoro da Fonseca.

Battle of Cerro Corá

The last battle of the campaign was at Cerro Corá, in which a Brazilian force of 4,000 wiped out President López's personal guard of 100-250 soldiers, killing López, Vice President Sánchez and López's son Juan Francisco.

References

Bibliography
 Díaz Gavier, Mario, En tres meses en Asunción, Ed. del Boulevard, Rosario, Argentina, 2005. 
 Doratioto, Francisco, Maldita Guerra. Nueva Historia de la Guerra del Paraguay, Ed. Emecé, Sao Paulo/Buenos Aires, 2008, pág. 30-35. 
 León Pomer, La guerra del Paraguay, Ed. Leviatán, Bs. As., 2008. 
 Rosa, José María, La guerra del Paraguay y las montoneras argentinas. Buenos Aires: Hyspamérica, 1986. 
 Ruiz Moreno, Isidoro J., Campañas militares argentinas, Tomo IV, Ed. Emecé, Bs. As., 2008. 
 Zenequelli, Lilia, Crónica de una guerra, La Triple Alianza, Ed. Dunken, Bs. As., 1997.

External links
 «La Guerra del Paraguay (Visión Argentina)», en LaGazeta.com.ar.
 «La Guerra del Paraguay», en ElOrtiba.org.
 «La guerra de la Triple Alianza en la literatura paraguaya», en NuevoMundo.revues.org.
 Fotos de la guerra de 1870, en Meucat.com.
 «La Guerra de la Triple Alianza», en ElHistoriador.com.ar.
 «La guerra del Paraguay», en Temakel.com.
 «South American Military History», en Reocities.com.
 Mapa de la Guerra de la Triple Alianza.

Conflicts in 1869
Conflicts in 1870
Battles involving Brazil
Battles involving Argentina
Battles involving Paraguay
Battles of the Paraguayan War